Marie Sainte Dédée Bazile, known as Défilée and Défilée-La-Folle, is a figure of the Haitian Revolution.  She is remembered for retrieving and burying the mutilated body of Emperor Dessalines after his assassination at Pont Larnage.

Life 
Dédée Bazile was born near Cap-Français to enslaved parents and made a living serving as a sutler to the army of Dessalines. There are varying accounts of her madness but according to legend, Dédée Bazile either developed mental illness after she was raped by her master at age 18, or after some of her family members were killed in the defeat of Dessalines's army by General Donatien Rochambeau.

Assassination of Dessalines 
On October 17, 1806, Emperor Dessalines was ambushed by his former comrades Alexandre Pétion, Jean-Pierre Boyer, André Rigaud, and Bruno Blanchet. He was fatally shot north of Port-au-Prince. His body was then brought into the city where it was stoned and mutilated by the crowds."Pendant que de nombreux enfants, au milieu de grands cris de joie, criblaient de coups de pierre les restes infortunés de Dessalines, sur la place du Gouvernement, une vieille femme folle nommée Défilée vint à passer. Elle s'approcha de l'attroupement que formaient les enfants...On lui dit que c'était Dessalines. Ses yeux égarés devinrent calmes tout à coup; une lueur de raison brilla sur ses traits. Elle alla à la course chercher un sac, revint sur la place, y mit ses restes ensanglantés et les transporta au cimetière intérieur de la ville. [Port-au-Prince] Le général Pétion y envoya quelques militaires qui, pour une modique somme, les enterrèrent."In English, this translates as: "While numerous children, in the midst of great cries of joy, covered the unfortunate remains of Dessalines with stone-impacts on the Government Place, an old, crazy woman named Défilée came by.  She approached the mob formed by the children...  She was told that it was Dessalines.  Her wild eyes suddenly became calm; a glimmer of reason shone across her features.  She went and fetched a sack, came back to the Place, put his bloodied remains therein, and took them to the interior cemetery the town [of Port-au-Prince].  General Pétion sent along some soldiers who, for a modest sum, buried them."Bazile, an admirer of Dessalines, gathered his remains in a sack and transported them to the Cimetière Intérieur to bury them.

Legacy 
Bazile died around 1816 and was buried in Port-au-Prince, but her grave has been lost. She was survived by her several children including her son Colonel Condol Bazile, officer of the constabulary under the Haitian president Faustin Soulouque. 

She is considered one of the four symbolic heroines of the independence of Haiti, alongside Sanité Bélair, Catherine Flon, and Cécile Fatiman.

References

External links 
 Femmes d'Haiti : Défilée, Dédée Bazile
 Re-membering Défilée: Dédée Bazile as Revolutionary Lieu de Mémoire
 Mémoire de femmes

Haitian independence activists
Haitian rebel slaves
Women in 19th-century warfare
Women in war in the Caribbean
Women of the Haitian Revolution
People from Nord (Haitian department)
18th-century rebels